Bendals is a town in Saint John Parish, Antigua and Barbuda.

Demographics 
Bendals has four enumeration districts.

 34400 Bendals Quar-Sch 
 34501  Bendals Rd-Bathlodge 
 34502  Bendals Rd-BendalsRd 
 34100 Bendals

Census Data 
Source:

References 

Saint John Parish, Antigua and Barbuda
Populated places in Antigua and Barbuda